Ihor Tistyk (born 27 May 1989) is a professional Ukrainian football defender who currently plays for Ukrainian First League club MFC Mykolaiv.

He is the product of the Karpaty Lviv Youth School System.

External links 
Website Karpaty Profile 
Profile on EUFO
Profile on Football Squads
Profile at Official FFU Site  (Ukr)

1989 births
Living people
Ukrainian footballers
FC Karpaty Lviv players
FC Obolon-Brovar Kyiv players
FC Helios Kharkiv players
MFC Mykolaiv players
Ukrainian Premier League players
Ukrainian expatriate footballers
Expatriate footballers in Poland
Sandecja Nowy Sącz players
Association football defenders
Sportspeople from Lviv